Batbaykor is a small hamlet in Gulmit, Gojal in Gilgit-Baltistan, Pakistan.

Populated places in Gilgit District